Infantino is an Italian surname of sicilian origin. Notable people with the surname include:

 Luigi Infantino (1921–1991), Italian operatic tenor
 Carmine Infantino (1925–2013), American comic book artist
 Gianni Infantino (born 1970), Swiss-Italian football administrator, president of FIFA from 2016
 Rafael Infantino (born 1984), Colombian cyclist
 Antonio Infantino (born 1991), Italian sprinter
 Gino Infantino (born 2003), Argentinian football player

Italian-language surnames